The following lists events that happened during 1960 in Mauritania.

Events

November
 November 28 - The African state of Mauritania became independent shortly after midnight, with Moktar Ould Daddah receiving the transfer of sovereignty from France's Prime Minister, Michel Debre. Daddah declared that "Mauritania ... will never forget what she owes the French people."

December
 December 4 - The Islamic Republic of Mauritania had applied to be the 100th member of the United Nations, but the request was vetoed in the Security Council by the Soviet Union, on grounds that Mongolia had been denied admission.

References

 
1960s in Mauritania
Mauritania
Mauritania
Years of the 20th century in Mauritania